Gowon or Go Won may refer to:

 Yakubu Gowon (born 1934), head of the Federal Military Government of Nigeria 1966-1975
 Kowon County, North Korea
 "Go Won", a single formally introducing the eleventh member of Loona
 Go Won, singer in South Korean girl group Loona

See also
 Gowan (disambiguation)